K+ is the debut mixtape of American vocalist Kilo Kish. It was released as a digital download on February 7, 2013.

Production
Several demos were recorded for K+, both in the studio and at home.

Reception

Initially, K+ received a mixed to positive critical response. BBC Music's Mike Diver wrote K+ recalled "both Lauryn Hill’s guard-down emotions, articulated brilliantly on The Miseducation of [Lauryn Hill], and the solid narrative structure that served Kendrick Lamar’s good kid, m.A.A.d city so well. Her promise is reaching fruition." Writing for The A&T Register, Jeffrey Lockhart felt the mixtape was "very well polished, and professional," and assumed that Kilo Kish had "a future in the music industry." NME writer Siân Rowe, giving the album a 7 out of 10, said that Kish "might not be entirely #wow just yet (unsurprising, considering she made songs for her debut ‘Homeschool’ EP as a “joke… kinda”) but she’s heading there." In a more varied review, Mike Madden of Consequence of Sound said the mixtape was "a very of-the-moment project" due to its influences and elements of genres like neo-soul and trap music, but criticized it because "it winds up so exemplary of some fads in music circa now – and gets so little out of them – that it’s all too easy to imagine it blending in with everything else that sounds similar and going obsolete within a year or two."

Track listing

Notes
 "Trappin'" features additional vocals by Earl Sweatshirt
 "Scones" features additional vocals by Childish Gambino

Sample credits
 "IOU" contains a sample of "SexyBack" as written by Justin Timberlake, Timothy Mosley and Floyd Nathaniel Hills and performed by Justin Timberlake and Timbaland, from the album FutureSex/LoveSounds

Personnel
Source:

Kilo Kish – songwriter, vocalist, producer
Childish Gambino – songwriter, vocalist, producer
Vince Staples – songwriter, vocalist
ASAP Ferg – songwriter, vocalist
Kilo Pez - songwriter
Earl Sweatshirt – vocalist, producer (as randomblackdude)
Flatbush Zombies – vocalists
Jesse Boykins III – vocalist
Joe McCaffery – guitarist
Star Slinger – producer
Matt Martians – producer
PROF CALC – producer
Very Rare – producer
Patrice Raige – producer
CRONOS – producer
Benjanim Julia – engineer
Leon Kelly – engineer
Joey Raia – mixer
Joe LaPorta – mastering
Phillip T. Annand – artwork

References

2013 mixtape albums
Kilo Kish albums
Albums produced by Earl Sweatshirt
Debut mixtape albums